In the US armed forces, separation means that a person is leaving active duty but not necessarily the service entirely. Separation typically occurs when someone reaches the date of their Expiration of Term of Service (ETS) and are released from active duty, but still must complete their military reserve obligations. Upon separation, they receive Form DD214, which verifies their military service.

It is important to keep a copy of DD-214 since it must be shown to receive Veterans Administration (VA) benefits. A veteran or next of kin may request a copy of the DD214 form by going to National Personal Records Center's website.

When service members completes their full military obligation, they are discharged and receive a formal certificate of discharge, usually an honorable discharge.

References

United States military policies
Military terminology of the United States